× Papilisia taiwaniana is an artificial hybrid of the orchid species Papilionanthe teres and Luisia megasepala. It arose after the introduction of Papilionanthe teres to Taiwan, where it interbred with the Taiwanese endemic Luisia megasepala. It was formerly included in Papilionanthe.

Description 
The occasionally branched, pendulous, terete stems are 30 to 60 cm in length and 4 to 4.5 mm wide. The terete, 14 to 21 cm long and 2 to 3.5 mm wide leaves are not strictly distichously arranged, but rather laxly alternate. Two 4–5 cm wide, yellowish flowers are produced on 2 to 3 cm long inflorescences. The labellum bears brown-red longitudinal stripes.

References 

Orchid hybrids
Flora of China
Flora of Taiwan
Intergeneric hybrids
Hybrid organisms
Hybrid plants
Aeridinae